Didier Moret (born 25 April 1975) is a Swiss ski mountaineer.

Moret was born in Riaz. He started ski mountaineering in 1996 and competed first in the Trophée de Plain Névé race on the Grand Muveran in the same year. He has been member of the national team since 2003 and enjoys also mountain biking and cross-country skiing.

Moret studied microtechnology at the École Polytechnique Fédérale de Lausanne.

Selected results 
 2003:
 1st, Swiss Cup
 3rd, Trophée des Gastlosen, together with Laurent Gremaud
 10th, European Championship team race (together with Christian Pittex)
 2004: 
 1st, Swiss Cup
 3rd, Trophée de Muveran
2005: 
 2nd, Swiss Cup
 3rd, European Championship team race (together with Christian Pittex)
 2006:
 10th, World Championship team race (together with  Pierre-Marie Taramarcaz)
 2nd, Swiss Cup
 2nd, Adamello Ski Raid (together with Christian Pittex and Alexander Hug)
 2nd, Trophée des Gastlosen, together with [[Sébastien EpLaurent Gremaudiney]]
 2007:
 2nd, Swiss Cup
 2008:
 1st, Swiss Cup
 2nd, World Championship relay race (together with Pierre Bruchez, Martin Anthamatten and Florent Troillet)
 10th, World Championship individual long distance race 
 2nd, Trophée des Gastlosen, together with Pierre Bruchez
 2009:
 1st, Swiss Cup
 3rd, Trophée des Gastlosen, together with Laurent Gremaud
 2012:
 1st, Trophée des Gastlosen, together with Laurent Gremaud

Trofeo Mezzalama 

 2003: 6th, together with Christian Pittex and Florent Troillet
 2005: 5th, together with Stéphane Gay and Yannick Ecoeur
 2009: 5th, together with Pierre Bruchez and Ernest Farquet
 2011: 8th, together with Marcel Theux and Alexander Hug

Patrouille des Glaciers 

 2004: 5th, together with Pius Schuwey and Emmanuel Vaudan
 2006: 2nd, together with Alexander Hug and Christian Pittex
 2008: 1st, together with Florent Troillet and Alexander Hug
 2010: 5th, together with Pierre Bruchez and Marcel Marti

External links 
 Official website
 Didier Moret at skimountaineering.org
 Interview (French)

References 

1975 births
Living people
Swiss male ski mountaineers
Sportspeople from the canton of Fribourg